Mombello di Torino is a comune (municipality) in the Metropolitan City of Turin in the Italian region Piedmont, located about  east of Turin.

Mombello di Torino borders the following municipalities: Moncucco Torinese, Arignano, Moriondo Torinese, and Riva presso Chieri.

References

Cities and towns in Piedmont